Heneage Wileman (1888–1926), sometimes known as Harry Wileman, was an English professional footballer, best remembered for his 11-year spell as a right half with Southend United either side of the First World War.

Personal life 
Wileman's brother Arthur was also a footballer and they played together at Newhall Swifts, Burton United, Chelsea and Southend United.

References 

1888 births
1926 deaths
People from Newhall, Derbyshire
Footballers from Derbyshire
English footballers
Association football wing halves
Burton United F.C. players
Chelsea F.C. players
Southend United F.C. players
Newhall Swifts F.C. players
English Football League players
Southern Football League players